Ferdinand Kübler (24 July 1919 – 29 December 2016) was a Swiss cyclist with 71 professional victories, including the 1950 Tour de France and the 1951 World Road Race Championship.

Biography
Kübler was born in Marthalen. He began racing professionally in 1940 but his early career was limited to Switzerland by the Nazi occupation elsewhere. He was multiple Swiss national champion and a three time winner of the Tour de Suisse. Kübler's most successful years in international racing were 1950–1952, when the classics had resumed after the Second World War. He won the La Flèche Wallonne and Liège–Bastogne–Liège, both in 1951 and 1952, in a time where these races were still contested in the same weekend. He was also World Road Race Champion in 1951, having placed second in 1949 and third in 1950.

Kübler rode the Giro d'Italia from 1950–1952, placing fourth once, and third twice. Kübler abandoned the 1947 and 1949 Tours de France, despite an early stage win in each. In the 1950 Tour, he benefited from the absence of Fausto Coppi, sidelined after a crash in the Giro. Overcoming Gino Bartali, Kübler became champion by over nine minutes, also winning three stages. In the 1954 Tour, Kübler won the points jersey and came second behind Louison Bobet.

Kübler was the first Swiss winner of the Tour de France. His biggest rival, Hugo Koblet, won the following year and as of 2021 they are the only riders from Switzerland to win the Tour.

Kübler was a high-spirited and impulsive rider sometimes given to strategically unwise attacks, out of exuberance and competitive drive. He was known as "the cowboy" because of his penchant for Stetson hats. He retired from racing in 1957 at 38.

Kübler died in Zurich on 29 December 2016 at the age of 97. Prior to his death he was the oldest living Tour de France winner.

Career achievements

Major results
Source:

1940
 national pursuit champion
1941
 national pursuit champion
 national mountain champion
1942
 national mountain champion
Tour de Suisse
1943
 national pursuit champion
1945
 national cyclo-cross champion
1947
Tour de France:
Winner stages 1 and 5
Wearing yellow jersey for one day
Paris-Lille
1948
 national road race champion
Tour de Suisse
Tour de Romandie
1949
Tour de France:
Winner stage 5
 national road race champion
1950
Challenge Desgrande-Colombo
Trophée Edmond Gentil
 national road race champion
Tour de France:
:Winner overall classification
Winner stages 6, 10 and 20
1951
 national road race champion
World road champion
Liège–Bastogne–Liège
Tour de Romandie
Flèche Wallonne
Week-end Ardennais
Tour de Suisse
Rome-Naples-Rome
1952
Challenge Desgrande-Colombo
Liège–Bastogne–Liège
Flèche Wallonne
Week-end Ardennais
1953
Bordeaux–Paris
1954
 national road race champion
Challenge Desgrande-Colombo
Tour de France:
2nd place overall classification
Winner stages 5 and 14
 Winner points classification
1956
Milan-Turin

Grand Tour results timeline

References

External links

  

Swiss male cyclists
Tour de France winners
UCI Road World Champions (elite men)
1919 births
2016 deaths
People from Andelfingen District
Tour de Suisse stage winners
Challenge Desgrange-Colombo winners
Sportspeople from the canton of Zürich